The New Macau Association (AMN) is a major pro-democratic political party in the Chinese Special Administrative Region of Macau. The party was established in 1992 and the founding chairman was António Ng Kuok Cheong, who departed from the then-mainstream livelihood faction and called for political reform in the colony. The current chairman is Icy Kam Sut Leng. At the, 20 September 2009 election, the association split into two electoral lists – the New Democratic Macau Association and the Prosperous Democratic Macau Association. The two lists combined won 19.35% of popular vote and 3 seats in the legislature. At the election in 2005, the group won a plurality of 18.8% of the popular vote and 2 out of 12 popular elected seats. In the 2013 election the association is split into three electoral lists with the addition of New Macau Liberals.

In July 2014, AMN's newly elected Vice President, Bill Chou Kwok Ping, was suspended without pay from his position as a political scientist at the University of Macau, after he advocated universal suffrage in a move seen by students, alumni and fellow academics as part of a slide towards unprecedented censorship in Macau's universities.

In mid-October 2014, both AL deputies António Ng Kuok Cheong and Au Kam San intend to seek more independence away from AMN and further reduce the financial support to AMN and that includes 20% of their salary. Both Ng and Au would remain members of AMN but would operate within their own policies rather than AMN's board.

Directly elected legislative assembly deputies
 António Ng Kuok Cheong, 1992–present (Quit the association in 2017)
 Au Kam San, 2001–present (Quit the association in 2016)
 Paul Chan Wai Chi, 2009–2013
 Sulu Sou Ka Hou, 2017–present

Chairs
 António Ng Kuok Cheong, 10 July 1992 – 10 July 1994
 Lok Wai Chong (陸偉聰), 10 July 1994 – 10 July 1996
 Tong Ka Io (湯家耀), 10 July 1996 – 10 July 1998
 Au Kam Ming (區錦明), 10 July 1998 – 10 July 2000
 Tong Ka Io (湯家耀), 10 July 2000 – 10 July 2002
 Au Kam Ming (區錦明), 10 July 2002 – 10 July 2004
 Carlos Sin Doe Ling (冼道寧), 10 July 2004 – 10 July 2006
 Paul Chan Wai Chi, 10 July 2006 – 10 July 2010
 Jason Chao Teng Hei, 10 July 2010 – 10 July 2014
 Sulu Sou Ka Hou (蘇嘉豪), 10 July 2014 – August 2015
 Scott Chiang Meng Hin (鄭明軒), August 2015 – 2017
 Kam Sut leng (甘雪玲), August 2017 – present

Legislative Assembly elections

See also 
 Politics of Macau
 Legislative Assembly of Macau

References

External links 
 

Political parties in Macau
1992 establishments in Macau